The United States Naval Sea Cadet Corps (USNSCC or NSCC) is a congressionally chartered, U.S. Navy-sponsored organization that serves to teach individuals about the sea-going military services, U.S. naval operations and training, community service, citizenship, and an understanding of discipline and teamwork. The USNSCC is composed of two programs – the Navy League Cadet Corps (NLCC), which is for cadets ages 10-13; and the senior program, which is for cadets ages 13-18.

History

The NSCC was founded in 1958 by the Navy League of the United States at the request of the Department of the Navy. In 1962, the USNSCC was chartered under Title 36 of the United States Code as a non-profit youth organization with an emphasis towards the sea-going services of the United States.

In 2000, the U.S. Congress stated that the NSCC and related programs "provide significant benefits for the Armed Forces, including significant public relations benefits." Although under no service obligation, a sizeable percentage of cadets later enlist in the military. Members who attain the grade E-3 or Seaman/Airman or are in the program for 2 years, may enter as an advanced paygrade of E-3 if they join the Navy before they turn 24 years old, and E-2 in the Marine Corps or other services, due to the training they receive.

U.S. Navy training activities include, but are not limited to:

 Amphibious Operations Training
 Shipboard training 
 Coast Guard
 FAA Ground School
 JAG Legal Training 
 MAA (Master at Arms, the Navy equivalent to Military Police) Law Enforcement Academy
 POLA (Petty Officer Leadership Academy)
 Seabee (Naval Construction Battalions)
 Submarine Seminar (basic and advanced) 
 USN Seamanship Academy
 Firefighting and Damage Control School
 Port Operations
 Honor Guard School
 Field Medical School (Corpsman)
 Cybersecurity Training
 Joint Special Operations Command Training 
 SEAL Training 
 SWCC (Special Warfare Combat Crewman) IE "special boats" 
 EOD (Explosive Ordnance Disposal) Training 
 AIRR (Naval Helo Search And Rescue Swimmer) Training
 Advanced Music Training 
 Land Navigation Training 
 Field Operations Training 
 Homeland security training
 Search and rescue training
 Marksmanship training 
 Expeditionary Warfare Training
 Maritime Interdiction
 International Exchange Program
 Photojournalism
 Scuba 
 Naval Criminal Investigative Service training 
 Coastal Riverine training 
 Locally arranged training
 Lifeguard 
 U.S. Naval Academy Summer Seminar
 Due to COVID-19 there are virtual trainings offered

The USNSCC owns a ship, the USNSCS Grayfox, homeported in Port Huron, Michigan. The USNSCC also sponsors an International Exchange Program with other Sea Cadet programs around the world: exchange countries include the United Kingdom, Canada, Australia, Belgium, Germany, the Netherlands, New Zealand, South Korea, India, Japan, Singapore, South Africa, Sweden, Hong Kong, Russia, and Bermuda.

The Band of the West (BOTW) is a 30-member martial music team which is the only active marching band in the USNSCC. The band has been trained by the top military bands in the nation including the United States Navy Band, Marine Band San Diego and the 101st Army Reserve Band.

Uniforms

As of 10 January 2020 the U.S. Navy has authorized the NWU III Uniform to be worn by Cadets, Midshipmen, Instructors and Officers of the USNSCC. The NWU III uniform worn by the NSCC/NLCC is modified with official USNSCC/USNLCC tapes, shoulder flashes and 8-point cover flash. The only footwear authorized for wear with the NWU III is a black combat style boot. Coyote, Tan and Black "rough out" boots are not authorized for the NSCC.

Rates

Warrant officers are adult leaders who have received direct appointments into the USNSCC Officer Corps. Warrant Officers wear a modified navy warrant officer's (W-2) uniform appropriately marked with the NSCC Insignia. Warrant Officers normally serve a specific function or head a department within the unit and remain in the grade of Warrant Officer, however, may become an Ensign in the normal path of advancement after one year of service if they choose to do so. Candidates for Warrant Officer do not have to complete the Officer/Midshipman Study Guide prior to appointment, but have to have obtained the rank of E-6 or higher in any branch of the Armed Forces, serve 1 year as an instructor, and have a special skill, or speciality in the unit's operation.

Advancement and promotion

Cadets

Adult officers

Awards and decorations

Headquarters
Policy and guidance for the administration and operation of the Cadet Corps programs is established by a National Board of Directors. The National Vice President of the Navy League for Youth Programs serves concurrently as the National Chairman of the NSCC National Board, and the Vice Chairman of the NSCC National Board serves as the National President. Day-to-day administration of the programs is accomplished by a full-time Executive Director and small staff located in Arlington, Virginia.

Gallery

See also
Navy Junior ROTC
Cadet#United States
International Sea Cadet Association
Sea Cadets (various nations' Sea Cadet organizations)
U.S. Naval Academy
U.S. Merchant Marine Academy
U.S. Coast Guard Academy

References

External links

Naval Sea Cadet Corps. Navy.com (About the Navy: "Before the Navy"). Retrieved 2009-12-05.
Naval Sea Cadet Corps official website. Retrieved 2009-12-05.
National Resources Portal webpage on Naval Sea Cadet Corps official website. Retrieved 2009-12-05.
COMPASS: National Training Portal webpage on Naval Sea Cadet Corps official website. Retrieved 2009-12-05.
NSCC Alumni Association official website. Retrieved 2009-12-05.
International Sea Cadet Association  official website. Retrieved 2009-12-05.
International Exchange Program

Naval Sea Cadet Corps, United States
Naval Cadet organisations
Organizations based in Arlington County, Virginia
Youth organizations established in 1958
1958 establishments in the United States
Patriotic and national organizations chartered by the United States Congress